Amos Horev (born Amos Sochaczewer, 30 June 1924) is an Israeli military official and expert. He served as a commander in the Palmach the elite force of the Haganah before the founding of the state, and was later an Israeli Defense Forces (IDF) Major-General, Chief of Ordnance and subsequently Quartermaster General and Chief Scientist of the IDF, nuclear scientist, President of Technion University, and Chairman of Rafael. In June 2010, he was appointed to the Israeli special independent Turkel Commission of Inquiry into the Gaza flotilla raid.

Biography

Before the founding of the state of Israel
Amos Horev was born in Jerusalem on June 30, 1924. His father, Alec, was director of the mechanical workshop of the Hebrew University of Jerusalem. As a teenager he was among the founders of the Zionist youth movement Gordonia in Jerusalem.  He studied at the gymnasium and from the age of 14 was a member of the Haganah. He fought against Arabs during the 1936–1939 Arab revolt in Palestine. He was appointed as an officer in 1940 and was one of the first recruits to Palmach when he was founded in 1941. During the war of independence he participated in many battles in the Jerusalem area and toward the end of the war was assistant to Yitzhak Rabin.

He later attended MIT, where he studied mechanical engineering.

He was President of Technion University from 1973 to 1982, replacing Alexander Goldberg and succeeded by Josef Singer.

Decorations

Awards and recognition
Amos Horev was awarded the Israel Security Prize, and later was appointed as the Chairman of the Israel Security Prize and was the Chief Scientist of the Defense Ministry. He was Aluf (Major General), the highest rank in the Israel Defense Forces after the Chief of Staff.

References

1924 births
Living people
Israeli Jews
Jews in Mandatory Palestine
People from Jerusalem
Technion – Israel Institute of Technology alumni
MIT School of Engineering alumni
Rafael Advanced Defense Systems
Palmach members
Haganah members
Gaza flotilla raid
Academic staff of Technion – Israel Institute of Technology
Israeli scientists
Israeli mechanical engineers
Technion – Israel Institute of Technology presidents
Israel Defense Prize recipients